The Black Cove Formation is a geologic formation in Newfoundland and Labrador. It preserves fossils dating back to the Ordovician period.

See also

 List of fossiliferous stratigraphic units in Newfoundland and Labrador

References
 

Ordovician Newfoundland and Labrador
Ordovician southern paleotemperate deposits